"Runnin' Away" is a song by American band Sly and the Family Stone. It was released as a single in early 1972 and appears on their 1971 album, There's a Riot Goin' On. The song reached No. 23 on the U.S. Billboard Hot 100 and No. 15 on the Best Selling Soul Singles chart. Outside the U.S., "Runnin' Away" reached No. 17 on the UK Singles Chart.

Paul Haig version

In 1982, Scottish musician and former Josef K lead singer Paul Haig recorded his version of "Running Away". It was released as his debut single and reached No. 19 on the UK Indie Chart.

In Belgium, it was released on the independent record label, Les Disques Du Crepuscule.

Track listing
 "Running Away"
 "Time"

Other cover versions
It was later covered by artists such as the Raincoats and the Colourfield, whose version peaked at No. 84 in the UK.

References

1971 songs
1972 singles
Songs written by Sly Stone
Sly and the Family Stone songs
1982 debut singles
Paul Haig songs
1987 singles
The Colourfield songs
Song recordings produced by Sly Stone
Epic Records singles